Aulaconotus gracilicornis is a species of beetle in the family Cerambycidae. It was described by Makihara and A. Saito in 1985.

References

Agapanthiini
Beetles described in 1985